Bitter Moon is a 1992 erotic romantic thriller film directed by Roman Polanski and starring Peter Coyote, Emmanuelle Seigner, Hugh Grant and Kristin Scott Thomas. It is based on the novel Lunes de fiel  by the French author Pascal Bruckner, published in English as Evil Angels. The score was composed by Vangelis.

Plot
British couple Nigel and Fiona Dobson are on a Mediterranean cruise ship to Istanbul en route to India. They encounter a beautiful French woman, Mimi, and that night Nigel meets her while dancing alone in the ship's bar. Later Nigel meets her much older and disabled American husband, Oscar, who is a failed writer—acerbic, cynical and jaded.

Oscar invites Nigel to his cabin where he tells Nigel in great detail how he and Mimi first met on a bus in Paris and fell passionately in love. Nigel relates all to Fiona. Both are appalled by Oscar's exhibitionism, but Nigel is also fascinated by Mimi, who provokes him. Later, Oscar narrates how they explored bondage, sadomasochism, and voyeurism. As a contrast to their sexual adventurousness, we see Nigel and Fiona meeting a distinguished Indian gentleman, Mr. Singh, who is traveling with his little daughter Amrita.

Invited by Mimi, Nigel, escaping from a bridge game, goes to meet her in her cabin, but it turns out she and Oscar have played a joke on him. Nigel wants to leave, but another session unfolds, with Oscar describing how their hate/love relationship developed. Bored, he tried to break up, but Mimi begged him to let her live with him under any conditions. He complied, but started to explore sadistic fantasies at her expense, humiliating her in public. When Mimi became pregnant, he made her have an abortion, saying that he would be a terrible father. When he visited her in hospital, he was shocked by her condition and almost relented in his attempts to drive her away. He promised her a holiday in the Caribbean, but he got off the plane just before takeoff. Mimi departed alone, crying.

Leaving Oscar's cabin, Nigel meets Mimi and they kiss. Afterwards, he finds Fiona in the bar flirting with a young man. She warns Nigel not to stray too far, and that anything he can do, she can do better. Nigel goes to Oscar, who continues his narration. After two years of parties and one-night stands, he drunkenly stepped in front of a vehicle by accident. To his surprise, Mimi came to visit him in the hospital where he was recovering from minor injuries and a fractured femur. Mimi shook hands with him, then pulled him out of his bed and left him hanging in his traction device. Having become paraplegic this way, Oscar had no choice but to let Mimi move in with him again and take care of him. She reveled in dominating and humiliating him, seducing men in front of him. When Oscar was desperate and wanted to die, she gave him a gun as a birthday present. Having experienced highs and lows together, they realized they needed each other and actually got married.

Nigel clumsily tries to woo Mimi, encouraged and coached by Oscar. Things come to a head at the New Year's Eve party, when Fiona sees them dance together. Fiona tells him that Oscar had made her come to the party. She goes on to dance erotically with Mimi, which culminates in a passionate kiss, cheered on by the other partygoers. A stormy sea interrupts the party and the two women leave together. Nigel goes outside clutching a bottle of liquor and screams his frustration into the wind and waves.

Nigel finds Fiona in Oscar's cabin, sleeping naked side by side with Mimi. Oscar claims the women have had sex together. Nigel grabs his throat, but Oscar points a gun at him and he backs off. Oscar shoots the sleeping Mimi several times, then kills himself. While the bodies of Oscar and Mimi are being stretchered off the ship, Fiona and Nigel, shaken, embrace each other. Mr. Singh encourages his little girl to comfort them.

Cast

 Hugh Grant as Nigel Dobson
 Kristin Scott Thomas as Fiona Dobson
 Emmanuelle Seigner as Micheline "Mimi" Bouvier
 Peter Coyote as Oscar Benton
 Luca Vellani as Dado
 Boris Bergman as Oscar's friend
 Victor Banerjee as Mr. Isaiah Singh
 Sophie Patel as Amrita Singh
 Olivia Brunaux as Cindy
 Stockard Channing (uncredited) as Beverly

Reception
On its release in Europe (in 1992) and North America (in 1994), Bitter Moon was a commercial failure and received mixed reviews from critics. Variety commented that "Roman Polanski approaches rock bottom" and called the film "a phony slice of huis clos drama" with "a script that's all over the map and a tone that veers from outre comedy to erotic game-playing." Janet Maslin wrote in The New York Times: "Whatever else Mr. Polanski may be – nasty, mocking, darkly subversive in his view of the world – he definitely isn't dull. Bitter Moon is the kind of world-class, defiantly bad film that has a life of its own." A positive review came from Roger Ebert, who said "Polanski directs it without compromise or apology, and it's a funny thing how critics may condescend to it, but while they're watching it you could hear a pin drop." Time Out commented that "Polanski treats this slightly protracted tale of erotic obsession partly as deeply ironic black comedy", "rich and darkly disturbing" and "also wickedly entertaining." Reviewing the film in 2009, Scott Tobias wrote: "Bitter Moon is my favorite of the later-period Polanski films...nasty, potent, and psychologically knotty in a way that recalls the devil-may-care, enfant terrible Polanski of old." According to journalist Matthew Tempest, he and film director Christopher Nolan shared "a soft spot" for Bitter Moon as students.

Based on 35 reviews collected by Rotten Tomatoes, 63% of critics gave the film a positive review.

Score 
The film's score by Vangelis was never officially released for sale, although bootlegs of the music taken directly from the film itself have since been produced.

Year-end lists 
 7th – David Elliott, The San Diego Union-Tribune
 Top 10 (listed alphabetically, not ranked) – Matt Zoller Seitz, Dallas Observer
 Honorable mention – Howie Movshovitz, The Denver Post

See also
 Sadism and masochism in fiction

References

External links
 
 
 
 Bitter Moon movie stills

1992 films
1992 comedy-drama films
1992 romantic drama films
1990s erotic thriller films
French comedy-drama films
French independent films
French romantic drama films
French thriller films
British comedy-drama films
British independent films
British romantic drama films
British erotic thriller films
American black comedy films
American comedy-drama films
American independent films
American romantic drama films
American romantic thriller films
1990s French-language films
BDSM in films
Erotic romance films
American erotic thriller films
Films scored by Vangelis
Films about paraplegics or quadriplegics
Films about writers
Films based on French novels
Films directed by Roman Polanski
Films produced by Roman Polanski
Films shot in France
Films shot in Paris
1990s romantic thriller films
Columbia Pictures films
Films with screenplays by Gérard Brach
Films with screenplays by Roman Polanski
Films produced by Alain Sarde
Films set in the Mediterranean Sea
Films set on cruise ships
English-language French films
1990s black comedy films
1990s erotic films
Murder–suicide in films
Uxoricide in fiction
StudioCanal films
1990s American films
1990s British films
1990s French films
Films about disability